Basenji (born Sebastian Carlos Muecke) is an Australian electronic musician and DJ. He gained popularity through the Triple J Unearthed competition. He was then signed to the record label, future classic in 2014, through which he released several singles and one extended play. He has performed at Splendour In The Grass and Falls Festival.

According to Hannah Galvin of Purple Sneakers, "[he] is making amazing, boundary-pushing electronic music; something he's been lucky enough to take up full-time. Looking ridiculously comfortable on stage, [he] played a nice big bunch of both original and remixed tracks, including a slowed down, sensual version of Disclosure's 'Latch' and his breakthrough single 'Dawn'."

His track, "Can't Get Enough" (2015), is used in the opening of the techno thriller film, Nerve (July 2016), and on its associated soundtrack. He undertook a tour of the United States. His single, "Mistakes" (featuring Tkay Maidza) (November 2017), peaked at No. 16 on the ARIA Charts Hitseekers Singles chart. AllMusic's Matt Collar observed, "[he] is an in-demand electronic musician, DJ, and producer known for his buoyant, pop-oriented tracks."

Discography

Extended plays

Singles

References

Living people
Australian electronic musicians
Australian DJs
Electronic dance music DJs
Year of birth missing (living people)